Beat the Turtle Drum is a 1968 coming-of-age middle grade fiction book by Constance C. Greene, following a summer in which two sisters save up the money to rent a horse, after which tragedy strikes in an unexpected accident. This story is semi-autobiographical in nature, inspired by Greene's own childhood experience with the death of a sister. An ALA Notable Book and the recipient of multiple awards, Beat the Turtle Drum was adapted into an ABC Afterschool Special in the 1970s, and has been printed in multiple editions. The book was illustrated by Donna Diamond.

Plot
Written in a diary format, the story follows Kate, a thirteen-year-old aspiring poet, whose best friend is her little sister, eleven-year-old Joselyn (nicknamed "Joss"). Joss, obsessed with horses, wants to save the money to rent a horse of her own, which Kate joins in on happily. Renting a horse comes with some difficulties, including a nosy spinster neighbour and a latent crush on a local boy. Unspoken rivalries and an age gap threaten to make the sisters more distant, especially since Kate is becoming a teenager while Joss is still interested in childish things. Moreover, Joss is often treated as the "perfect" sister, while Kate is often criticized by their parents.

When Kate and Joss finally have the money to rent their horse for Joss's upcoming birthday, they try to build the horse a shed with the help of their younger best friend, Tootie. Eventually realizing that the construction project isn't feasible after a storm blows the shed over, the three girls decide to keep the horse in the garage. Joss is given the horse, named Prince, for a week-long rental from eccentric neighbours Mr. and Mrs. Essig. Mrs. Pemberthy, the sisters' nosy alcoholic neighbour, does not approve of the horse, but this does not deter the girls, who are determined to spend Joss's birthday happily. They plan a picnic, climbing into a tall old tree to eat at the top of it. When Joss attempts to look out to the distance and watch for Prince, she slips from the treetop and falls, dying instantly.

Kate's story concludes with the various reactions of the people around her to the loss of Joss. Mrs. Pemberthy attempts to make amends in myriad strange ways, while the Essigs respond with kindness and personal anecdotes. Tootie, too young to understand her own grief, tries to learn. Kate finds herself unable to move on from the accident, and admits that she no longer expects herself to move on either, although she tries to make peace with Joss's death and continues to write when she can.

Reception
Beat the Turtle Drum has been compared with similar book Bridge to Terabithia as an exploration of childhood death from a child's perspective, earning praise early-on for its approach to the subject matter. Barbara Wersba, a critic for The New York Times, said of the book, "it is a simple book, and in many ways an unexceptional one. But its characters are human, and its heartbreak is true... in a very quiet way, Constance C. Greene has written a remarkable tale." Kirkus Reviews agreed, saying of the book, "leaving the reader almost as unprepared as Kate is for the tragedy could be considered sneaky, but it's certainly effective; young readers lulled by Greene's net of contentment are bound to share Kate's shock as well as her earlier pleasure." Publishers Weekly praised Beat the Turtle Drum in Constance C. Greene's obituary, pointing out, "Greene said that Beat the Turtle Drum was her most autobiographical book and, unlike most of her other novels, it had a heavier theme: the death of a sister. The story was based on Greene’s childhood loss of her own older sister. Beat the Turtle Drum was adapted as an ABC Afterschool Special titled Very Good Friends". Beat the Turtle Drum was the recipient of the ALA Notable Book award and the CBC Children's Choice award.

Film adaptation
Beat the Turtle Drum was adapted into an ABC Afterschool Special made-for-television film titled Very Good Friends, also marketed as Beat the Turtle Drum. The latter title was changed for the adaptation due to concerns over potential audience confusion over the meaning of the phrase "turtle drum", which had been a line of poetry cited in the original book, credited to Ian Serraillier. The film was released as part of a four-part set on DVD.

See also
Bridge to Terabithia (novel)
Waiting To Dive

References 

Coming-of-age fiction
1968 novels
American children's novels
Novels about death
Works about child death
Novels about horses
Viking Press books